Sidney Rodrigue Noukpo Govou (born 27 July 1979) is a French former professional footballer who played primarily as a winger, but was occasionally deployed as a striker. He holds the record for most Ligue 1 titles won (seven), along with Hervé Revelli and Jean-Michel Larqué of Saint-Étienne, as well as Thiago Silva and Marco Verratti of Paris Saint–Germain, and his own former teammates Grégory Coupet and Juninho of Lyon.

Club career

Lyon
Staying at school to complete his studies to a comparatively late age for a footballer, Govou was a late-comer to the sporting world, joining Lyon's youth academy at the age of 17 in 1996. Loyal to his first club, until 2010, Govou had played at the Stade Gerland for his entire professional career. Govou broke onto the scene during the 2000–01 Ligue 1 season helping Lyon finish in second, just four points behind champions FC Nantes. Because of his great performances for the club, Govou won the 2001 Young Player of the Year Award in Ligue 1.

Govou has often been criticised for his lack of composure in front of goal, especially in high-pressure situations, which partly explains why he now occupies a deeper role, often in wide positions, rather than playing as the focal point of the team's attack. His offensive role, however, does not prevent him from often playing an important role in recovering possession for his team, due largely to his great athletic capabilities and high levels of fitness. He also has a good heading ability.

During the 2004–05 season, Paul Le Guen handed Govou the captain's armband during the long absence of club captain Claudio Caçapa due to injury. Le Guen's decision was largely motivated by the loyalty displayed towards the club by Govou, in face of much speculation linking him with moves away from the club. Indeed, for the last three seasons, Govou had been regularly linked to possible transfers away from Lyon, much helped by Govou's admittance to finding the possibility of playing abroad an attractive one.  On 24 May 2008, Govou scored the only goal of the game in added extra time, volleying home a cross, and was named "Man of the Match" as Lyon defeated PSG in the final of the Coupe de France, the club's first cup success since 1973.

Govou and Lyon endured a difficult 2009–10 Ligue 1 campaign. He appeared in 30 league games for Lyon, starting 22, but managed just two goals and two assists as Lyon finished runners up to Olympique de Marseille. In November 2009, Lyon hosted Marseille at the Stade Gerland in what would become an epic encounter. Govou scored a memorable goal in the 14th minute, making a sensational run with the ball from beyond midfield and then slotting it past Steve Mandanda to give the hosts a 2–1 lead. The game would go back and forth for the rest of the match, with Lyon leading 5–4 in the 90th minute until an own goal from teammate Jérémy Toulalan meant that the points would be shared.  Lyon eventually finished in second spot, securing an automatic place in the group stage of the Champions League.

Panathinaikos
On 2 July 2010, Govou signed a three-year contract with Panathinaikos in Greece, with the playmaker reportedly earning €1.5 million a year. On 14 September 2010, he scored against FC Barcelona at the Camp Nou to give Panathinaikos the lead, although they eventually lost the game 5–1. On 2 July 2011, it was announced by Panathinaikos that Govou had been released from the club by mutual consent. The player was partly released because of Panathinaikos' financial problems, and it was reported that other French players Djibril Cissé and Jean-Alain Boumsong would exit to free up the cheque book.  During his time at the club, he was punished twice for inappropriate behavior related to "late night activities." Govou appeared in 24 games and scored three goals in all competitions for Panathinaikos.

Évian

On 5 July 2011, Govou signed a two-year contract with newly promoted Ligue 1 side Évian.
He made his debut for the club in their first ever Ligue 1 game away to Stade Brest. Govou played the full 90 minutes and helped his new squad to a 2–2 draw, earning their first ever point in the French top flight.

Govou recorded his first goal for Évian in a 3–2 defeat to Stade Rennais on 7 February 2012, a result which eliminated his side from the Coupe de France in the Round of 16.  His first league goal came 11 days later when he netted a 90th-minute equalizer to prevent Stade Malherbe Caen from getting all three points.

Govou made his first appearance of the 2012–13 Ligue 1 season on 24 August 2012, replacing Daniel Wass in the 90th minute of a 1–1 draw with former club Lyon. On 10 November, Govou provided the assist from which Youssef Adnane scored the game-winning goal for Evian, a 2–1 defeat of Reims.

Return to Lyon
In October 2013, Govou signed with his former club Lyon on an amateur contract, restricting him to play only with the club's reserve team.

Monts d'Or Azergues
On 27 January 2014, Govou signed with fourth division side Monts d'Or Azergues, partnering up with former International Ludovic Giuly. 21 February, rumours surfaced Govou had been fired by the club for participating in the viral Internet drinking game Neknomination. However, the club denied taking any action against the player the following day.

FC Miami City
On 1 June 2015, Govou signed with FC Miami City Champions in the USL Premier Development League (PDL), the fourth tier of the American Soccer Pyramid, in the Southeast Division.

International career
Govou was not selected initially for the Euro 2004 or 2006 World Cup competitions, but was called up to join the French squads to replace players Ludovic Giuly and Djibril Cissé, respectively, both suffering injuries shortly before the start of the competitions.

Govou scored two goals in France's 3–1 win over world champions Italy in a Euro 2008 qualifier. The game was the first meeting between the two teams since Italy beat France in the 2006 World Cup Final. Govou scored his first goal by heading, just 67 seconds into the game. His second came in the 55th minute.

Govou also represented his country at the 2010 World Cup in South Africa.  Govou appeared in all three group games for France, as Les Bleus finished last in Group A and managed just one goal. Govou started against Uruguay and Mexico and came on as a late substitute against South Africa.

Personal life
Govou was born in France, and is of Beninese descent. He married Clémence Catherin on 18 June 2011 at Replonges (Ain, France). To date, they have two children: a son named Marley, born 25 February 2009, and a daughter named Jude, born on 20 February 2014. He has also, with his ex-girlfriend Pascale, an elder daughter named Naomy, born on 11 February 2005.

On 18 April 2010, it was first reported by French television service M6 that four members of the French national team were being investigated for their roles as clients of a prostitution ring that was being operated inside of a Paris nightclub with some of the women possibly being underage. The report also stated that two of the players were already questioned as witnesses by judge André Dando and a group of magistrates. The report described the two players as being one who "is a major player in a big foreign club" and that the other "plays in the championship of France Ligue 1". Later that day, the players were discovered to be Govou, Karim Benzema and Franck Ribéry. On 29 April, the country's Secretary of State for Sports Rama Yade, after refusing to publicly comment on the case in its infancy, declared that any player placed under investigation should not represent the France national team. The following day, a judicial source confirmed that the players would not be placed under official investigation, if at all, before the start of the 2010 FIFA World Cup. On 20 July, they were questioned by Paris police and, following questioning, was indicted by judge Dando on the charge of "solicitation of a minor prostitute". In November 2011 prosecutors asked for the cases against them to be dropped, saying that the players were not aware that the escort, identified as Zahia Dehar, was 16 years old when they had paid to have sex with her.

Career statistics

International
International goals

Honours
Lyon
Division/Ligue 1: 2001–02, 2002–03, 2003–04, 2004–05, 2005–06, 2006–07, 2007–08
Coupe de France: 2007–08
Coupe de la Ligue: 2000–01
Trophée des Champions: 2002, 2004, 2005, 2007

France
FIFA Confederations Cup: 2003
FIFA World Cup runner-up: 2006

Individual
Division 1 Young Player of the Year: 2000–01

References

External links

 
 
 
 

Living people
People from Le Puy-en-Velay
French footballers
Olympique Lyonnais players
Panathinaikos F.C. players
Thonon Evian Grand Genève F.C. players
Ligue 1 players
Super League Greece players
France international footballers
France under-21 international footballers
2003 FIFA Confederations Cup players
UEFA Euro 2004 players
2006 FIFA World Cup players
2010 FIFA World Cup players
UEFA Euro 2008 players
FIFA Confederations Cup-winning players
French expatriate footballers
Expatriate footballers in Greece
French sportspeople of Beninese descent
FC Miami City players
USL League Two players
Expatriate soccer players in the United States
GOAL FC players
1979 births
Association football midfielders
Black French sportspeople
Sportspeople from Haute-Loire
Footballers from Auvergne-Rhône-Alpes